Larri Thomas (January 23, 1932 – October 20, 2013) was an American actress and dancer. She began her career by participating in a string of television commercials and eventually signed a contract with NBC. The network put on her shows including Peter Gunn and The Lucy-Desi Comedy Hour. She became one of the six Goldwyn Girls picked by Samuel Goldwyn to go on tour for the movie Guys and Dolls, in which she makes a brief appearance. She was also in the movies Mary Poppins and Island of Love. She was the stand-in for Julie Andrews in some flying sequences in Mary Poppins and also her stand-in in The Sound of Music. She also appeared in movies and television with Dean Martin.

Personal life
Writer Lida Larrimore Thomas was her mother. Her 1951 novel The Lovely Duckling was written about Larri's childhood on the family farm in Wayne, Pennsylvania.

In December 1955, she married John Bromfield, star of the syndicated crime drama Sheriff of Cochise, from whom she was divorced in 1959. In 1972, she managed to acquire one of her biggest roles, as Henrietta Hippo on the television show New Zoo Revue. Later, Thomas was married to Bruce Hoy and participated in a number of charity benefits, such as the Professional Dancers Society. In 1960 it was reported that she was in a relationship with baseball player/manager Leo Durocher.

Death
She died on October 20, 2013, due to natural causes, in her Van Nuys home. She was 81 years old. Her husband, Bruce Hoy died on January 31, 2014.

Filmography
Coach .... Woman #1 (1 episode, 1993)
"Christmas of the Van Damned" (1993) TV Episode .... Woman #1
Earth Girls Are Easy (1988) .... Curl Up and Dye Dancer
In God We Tru$t (1980)
New Zoo Revue (1972) TV Series .... Henrietta Hippo (196 episodes)
Frankie and Johnny (1966) (uncredited) .... Earl Barton dancer
The Silencers (1966) (uncredited) .... Specialty Dancer
The Dean Martin Show .... Regular (3 episodes, 1965)
Episode dated October 28, 1965 TV Episode (uncredited) .... Regular
Episode dated September 23, 1965 TV Episode (uncredited) .... Regular
Episode dated September 16, 1965 TV Episode (uncredited) .... Regular
The Sound of Music (1965) .... Stand-in for Julie Andrews
The Doctors and The Nurses The Prisoner: Part 1 (1964) TV Episode (as Lorie Thomas) .... Helen Walsh
Mary Poppins (1964) (uncredited) .... Woman in Carriage & Stand-in for Julie Andrews
Robin and the 7 Hoods (1964) (uncredited) .... Dancer
Island of Love (1963) (uncredited)
His Model Wife (1962) (TV) (as Lorrie Thomas)
The Music Man (1962) (uncredited) .... High School Girl
The Beat Generation (1959) (uncredited)
Ask Any Girl (1959) (uncredited)
Westinghouse Desilu Playhouse .... Miss Hairdo (1 episode, 1959)
"Lucy Wants a Career" (1959) TV Episode .... Miss Hairdo
Peter Gunn .... Sharon Moore (1 episode, 1958)
Rough Buck (1958) TV Episode .... Sharon Moore
South Pacific (1958) (uncredited) .... Nurse in Thanksgiving show
Curucu, Beast of the Amazon (1956) .... Vivian, the dancer
 Guys and Dolls (1955), Goldwyn Girl, as one of the Hot Box Girls (uncredited) 
Love Me or Leave Me (1955) (uncredited) .... Chorus girl
Ring of Fear (1954) as a Strong Woman - talking part
House of Wax (1953) (uncredited) as a can-can girl 
Where's Raymond - TV Series (1953-1954)..... Dancer

References

External links
 

1932 births
2013 deaths
Actresses from Pennsylvania
American film actresses
American television actresses
People from Delaware County, Pennsylvania
Accidental deaths from falls
20th-century American actresses
Accidental deaths in California
American female dancers
Dancers from Pennsylvania
21st-century American women